Zolmabad (also Romanized as Z̧olmābād; also known as Shahrak-e Shahīd Madanī) is a village in Aghili-ye Jonubi Rural District, Aghili District, Gotvand County, Khuzestan Province, Iran. At the 2006 census, its population was 1,714, in 313 families.

References 

Populated places in Gotvand County